The 2021 South American Under-23 Championships in Athletics was the ninth edition of the biennial track and field competition for South American athletes aged under 23 years old, organised by Atletismo Sudamericano. The event was originally scheduled for 2020 but had to be postponed due to the COVID-19 pandemic.

Medal summary

Men

Women

Mixed

Medal table

Participation

References

Live results

2018
South American Under-23 Championships in Athletics
South American Under-23 Championships in Athletics
South American Under-23 Championships in Athletics
Sports competitions in Guayaquil
International athletics competitions hosted by Ecuador
South American Under-23 Championships in Athletics